The 9th Annual Latin Grammy Awards took place on Thursday, November 13, 2008, at the Toyota Center in Houston, Texas and were aired on Univision. The Brazilian Field awards were presented on the same day at the Ibirapuera Auditorium in São Paulo. The Latin Recording Academy Person of the Year was Gloria Estefan. Juanes was the night's big winner, winning 5 awards including Album of the Year. He now has 17 Latin Grammy awards which is more than any other recording artist. The show was watched by an average of 5.8 millions.

Awards
Winners are in bold text.

General
Record of the Year
Juanes — "Me Enamora"
 Andrea Bocelli and Laura Pausini — "Vive Ya! (Vivere)"
 Cabas — "Bonita"
 Café Tacuba — "Volver a Comenzar"
 Julieta Venegas — "El presente"

Album of the Year
Juanes — La Vida... Es un Ratico
 Concha Buika — Niña de Fuego
 Café Tacvba — Sino
 Vicente Fernández — Para Siempre
 Kany García — Cualquier Día

Song of the Year
Juanes — "Me Enamora"
 Julieta Venegas — "El presente"
 Café Tacuba — "Esta Vez"
 Kany García — "Hoy Ya Me Voy"
 Aureo Baqueiro and Gian Marco — "Todavía"

Best New Artist
Kany García
 Mónica Giraldo
 Diogo Nogueira
 Roberta Sá
 Ximena Sariñana

Pop
Best Female Pop Vocal Album
Kany García — Cualquier Día
 Ana Gabriel — Arpegios de Amor: Requiem por Tres Almas
 Alejandra Guzmán — Fuerza
 Ednita Nazario — Real
 Rosario — Parte de Mí

Best Male Pop Vocal Album
Juanes — La Vida... Es un Ratico
 Ricardo Arjona — Quién Dijo Ayer
 Jeremías — Un Día Más En El Gran Circo
 Alejandro Lerner — Enojado
 Gian Marco — Desde Adentro

Best Pop Album by a Duo/Group with Vocals
Belanova — Fantasía Pop
 Hombres G — 10
 Kudai — Nadha
 Kumbia All Starz — Planeta Kumbia
 RBD — Empezar Desde Cero

Urban
Best Urban Music Album
Wisin & Yandel — Los Extraterrestres
 Alexis & Fido — Sobrenatural
 Tego Calderón — El Abayarde Contraataca
 Flex — Te Quiero: Romantic Style In Da World
 Tito El Bambino — It's My Time

Best Urban Song
Flex — "Te Quiero"
 Tingui and Daddy Yankee — "Al Son del Boom" (Miguelito featuring Daddy Yankee)
 Tito El Bambino — "El Tra"
 Tego Calderón — "Ni Fu Ni Fa"
 Alexis, Fido and Toby Love — "Soy Igual Que Tú"

Rock
Best Rock Solo Vocal Album
Andrés Calamaro — La Lengua Popular
 Chetes — Efecto Dominó
 Alih Jey — Necia
 Juanse — Energía Divina
 Loquillo — Balmoral
 Siddhartha — Why You?

Best Rock Album by a Duo/Group with Vocals
Molotov — Eternamiente Bersuit — ?
 Catupecu Machu — Laberintos Entre Artistas y Dialectos
 Héroes del Silencio — Tour 2007
 Panda — Sinfonía Soledad

Best Rock SongCafé Tacuba — "Esta Vez" Javier Morales — "Ayer" (Black Guayaba)
 Andrés Calamaro and Cachorro López — "Carnaval de Brasil" (Andrés Calamaro)
 Andrés Calamaro — "Mi Gin Tonic"
 Randy Ebright — "Yofo" (Molotov)

Alternative
Best Alternative Music AlbumJulieta Venegas — MTV Unplugged Babasónicos — Mucho Café Tacuba — Si No Circo — Cursi Manu Chao — La RadiolinaBest Alternative Song
Café Tacuba — "Volver a Comenzar"
  José Luis Abreu, Marteen Andruet and Orlando Méndez — "Alguien" (Circo)
 Andrés Calamaro — "5 Minutos Más (Minibar)"
 Juan Campodónico and Fernando Santullo — "El Mareo" (Bajofondo featuring Gustavo Cerati)
 Ximena Sariñana — "Normal"
 María del Mar Rodríguez Carnero — "Papeles Mojados" (Chambao)

Tropical
Best Salsa Album
Marc Anthony — El Cantante
 Grupo Galé — Auténtico Víctor Manuelle — Soy Maelo Ruiz — Puro Corazón... Gilberto Santa Rosa — ContrasteBest Cumbia/Vallenato Album
Peter Manjarrés, Emiliano Zuleta and Sergio Luis — Sólo Clásicos
 Chicas de Canela — Chicas de Canela El Combo de las Estrellas — Somos La Esencia Gusi & Beto — La Mandarina Emilianito Zuleta and Toba Zuleta — Palabra de HonorBest Contemporary Tropical Album
José Feliciano — Señor Bachata
 Joe Arroyo — El Súper Joe Fonseca — Gratitud Adriana Lucía — Porro Nuevo Olga Tañón — Éxitos en Dos TiemposBest Traditional Tropical Album
Gloria Estefan — 90 Millas
 Albita, Rey Ruiz and Donato Poveda — Cuba: Un Viaje Musical Chucho Avellanet with Trío Los Andinos — Bohemio Edwin Colón Zayas — El Cuarto Puertorriqueño... Reafirmación Víctor Manuelle — Una Navidad A Mi EstiloBest Tropical Song
Emilio Estefan, Jr., Gloria Estefan, Alberto Gaitán and Ricardo Gaitán — "Píntame De Colores" (Gloria Estefan)
 Juan José Hernández — "Conteo Regresivo" (Gilberto Santa Rosa)
 Víctor Manuelle — "Llegó El Amor" (Gilberto Santa Rosa)
 Jorge Celedón — "Me Vio Llorar" (Jorge Celedón and Jimmy Zambrano)

Singer-Songwriter
Best Singer-Songwriter Album
Fito Páez — Rodolfo
 Djavan — Matizes Gilberto Gil — Banda Larga Cordel Pablo Milanés — Regalo Tommy Torres — Tarde O TempranoRegional Mexican
Best Ranchero Album
Vicente Fernández — Para Siempre
 Pepe Aguilar — 100% Mexicano Pedro Fernández — Dime Mi Amor Los Temerarios — Recuerdos del Alma Jenni Rivera — La Diva en VivoBest Banda Album
Los Horóscopos de Durango — Ayer, Hoy y Siempre
 Banda el Recodo — Qué Bonito... ¡Es Lo Bonito! El Chapo — Mis Rancheras Consentidas Los Creadorez del Pasito Duranguense de Alfredo Ramírez — Listos, Montados y Armados Joan Sebastian — No Es De MaderaBest Tejano Album
Emilio Navaira — De Nuevo
 Chente Barrera & Taconazo — Music Lessons Jimmy González & El Grupo Mazz — Incomparable Freddie Martínez — The Legend Returns Elida Reyna — DomingoBest Norteño Album
Siggno — Six Pack
 Conjunto Primavera — Que Ganas de Volver Los Palominos — Me Enamoré de un Angel Los Tigres del Norte — Raíces Pesado — Corridos: Defendiendo el HonorBest Regional Mexican Song
Joan Sebastian — "Estos Celos" (Vicente Fernández)
 Freddie Martínez, Jr. — "Búscame En El Cielo" (Jimmy González & El Grupo Mazz)
 Charlie Corona and Jesse Turner — "Decirte Te Quiero" (Siggno)
 Adolfo Angel — "Si Tú Te Vas" (Los Temerarios)

Instrumental
Best Instrumental Album
Orquesta Filarmónica de Bogotá — Orquesta Filarmómoca de Bogotá - 40 Años
 Kenny G — Rhythm & Romance Paulo Moura — Pra Cá E Para Lá Gonzalo Rubalcaba — Avatar Bebo Valdés and Javier Colina — Live at the Village VanguardTraditional
Best Folk Album
Cholo Valderrama — Caballo!
 Damaris — Mil Caminos Mariza — Terra Perú Negro — Zamba Malató Walter Silva — 20 ÉxitosBest Tango Album
Various Artists — Buenos Aires, Días y Noches de Tango
 Esteban Morgado Cuarteto — Milongueros Luis Salinas — Tango Javier Vinasco and Edith Ruiz — Astos Piazzolla/Heitor Villa-Lobos Pablo Ziegler, Quique Sinesi and Walter Castro — Buenos Aires ReportBest Flamenco Album
Juan Habichuela — Una Guitarra En Granada
 Diego Amador — Río de los Canasteros Camarón de la Isla — Reencuentro Esperanza Fernández — Recuerdos Lole — MetáforaJazz
Best Latin Jazz Album
Caribbean Jazz Project featuring Dave Samuels — Afro Bop Alliance
 Hamilton de Holanda Quinteto — Brasilianos 2 Pau Brasil — Nonada David Sánchez — Cultural Survival Charlie Sepúlveda & The Turnaround — Charlie Sepulveda & The TurnaroundChristian
Best Christian Album (Spanish Language)
Soraya Moraes — Tengo Sed de Tí
 Aline Barros — Refréscate! Alex Campos — Cuidaré de Ti Jesus Adrian Romero — Ayer Te Ví... Fue Más Claro Que La Luna Marcos Witt — Sinfonía del AlmaBest Christian Album (Portuguese Language)
Soraya Moraes — Som Da Chuva
 Aline Barros — Aline Barros & CIA 2 Fernanda Brum — Cura-Me Toque No Altar — E Impossivel Mas Deus Pode Andre Valadao — Sobrenatural Italo Villar — Deus Sonha Com VocéBrazilian
Best Brazilian Contemporary Pop Album
Vanessa da Mata — Sim
 Arnaldo Antunes — Ao Vivo no Estúdio Danni Carlos — Música Nova Ney Matogrosso — Inflassificáveis Rosa Passos — RomanceBest Brazilian Rock Album
CPM 22 — Cidade Cinza
 Charlie Brown Jr. — Ritmo, Ritual e Responsa Detonautas Roque Clube — O Retorno de Saturno Nação Zumbi — Fome de Tudo Pitty — {Des}concerto ao Vivo - 06-07-07 Traje: (Rock Fino)Best Samba/Pagode Album
Paulinho da Viola — Acústico MTV

Maria Rita — Samba Meu
 Beth Carvalho — Canta o Samba da Bahia ao Vivo Arlindo Cruz — Sambista Perfeito Luiz Melodia — Estação MelodiaBest MPB Album
Seu Jorge — América Brasil o Disco
 Maria Bethânia — Dentro do Mar Tem Rio - Ao Vivo Chico Buarque — Chico Buarque Carioca - Ao Vivo Omara Portuondo and Maria Bethânia — Omara Portuondo e Maria Bethânia Roberta Sá — Que Belo Estranho Dia Pra Se Ter Alegria Caetano Veloso — Multishow ao Vivo CêBest Romantic Music Album
César Menotti & Fabiano — .com Você
 Bruno & Marrone — Acústico II - Volume 1 Daniel — Difícil Não Falar de Amor Leonardo — Coração Bandido Roberta Miranda — Senhora RaizBest Contemporary Brazilian Roots Album
Elba Ramalho — Qual o Assunto Que Mais Lhe Interessa?
 Harmonia do Samba — Esse Som Vai Te Levar - Ao Vivo Trio Curupira — Pés no Brasil, Cabeça no Mundo Trio Virgulino — 26 Anos de Estrada Victor & Leo — Ao Vivo em UberlândiaBest Brazilian Roots/Regional Album
Chitãozinho & Xororó — Grandes Clássicos Sertanejos Acústico I
 Pedro Bento and Zé da Estrada — 50 Anos de Mariachis & Grandes Sucessos Sertanejos Banda Calypso —  Acústico  Cezar & Paulinho — Companheiro é Companheiro Siba e A Fuloresta — Toda Vez Que Eu Dou Um Passo o Mundo Sai DolugarBest Brazilian Song
Marco Moraes and Soraya Moraes — "Som da Chuva" (Soraya Moraes)
 Vanessa da Mata and Sérgio Mendes — "Acode"
 Dudu Falcão — "Coisas Que Eu Sei" (Danni Carlos)
 Djavan — "Delírio dos Mortais"
 Jota Maranhão and Jorge Vercillo — "Ela Une Todas as Coisas" (Jorge Vercillo)

Children's
Best Latin Children Album
Miguelito — El Heredero
 Claraluna — Un Lugar Llamado Colombia Raquel Durães — Hora de Dormir Niños Adorando — Niños Adorando 3 Remi — Alegrate Strings For Kids — Acordes para Hormiguitas y Menudas CriaturasClassical
Best Classical Album
Plácido Domingo — Pasión Española
 Gustavo Dudamel — Fiesta Sérgio and Odair Assad — Jardim Abandonado Sílvio Barbato and Turíbio Santos — Violão SinfônicoBest Classical Contemporary Composition
Carlos José Castro — "Concierto del Sol" (Orquesta Filarmónica de Costa Rica)
Sérgio — "Tahhiyya Li Ossoulina" (Sérgio Assad and Odair Assad)
 Jorge Liderman — "Barcelonazo" (Jorge Liderman)
 Roberto Valera — "Non Divisi" (Camerata Romeu)
 Aurelio De La Vega — "Variación del Recuerdo" (The North/South Chamber Orchestra)

Recording Package
Best Recording Package
Leicia Gotlibowski, Daniel Kotliar, Karina Levy, Andres Mayo and Mercedes Sencio — Buenos Aires, Días y Noches de Tango (Various Artists)
 Santiago Velazco-Land — Cara B (Jorge Drexler)
 Jorge du Peixe and Valentina Trajano — Fome de Tudo (Nação Zumbi)
 Gaspar Guerra — Gózalo (Orquesta La 33)
 Fritz Torres — Tijuana Sound Machine (Nortec Collective presents Bostich and Fussible)

Production
Best Engineered Album
Moogie Canazio and Luiz Tornaghi — Dentro Do Mar Tem Rio - Ao Vivo (Maria Bethânia)
 Humberto Gatica and Bernie Grundman — David Cavazos (David Cavazos)
 Gabriel Peña, Héctor Iván Rosa, Bobby Valentín and José Lugo — Evolution (Bobby Valentín)
 Ariel Alejandro Gato — Obra Inversa (Obra Inversa)
 Chris Brooke, Steve Churchyard, Humberto Gatica, Rodolfo Vazquez and Stephen Marcussen — Rhythm & Romance (Kenny G)
Engineers: 
 Carlos "KK" Akamine, Al Schmitt and Doug Sax — Romance (Rosa Passos)

Producer of the Year
Sergio George
 Alejandro Acosta, Bob Benozzo and Roberto Cantero
 Tweety González and Ximena Sariñana
 Javier Limón
 Cachorro Lopez

Music Video
Best Short Form Music Video
Juanes — "Me Enamora"
 Babasónicos — "Pijamas"
 Bajofondo — "Pa' Bailar"
 Manu Chao — "Me Llaman Calle"
 Molotov — "Yofo"

Best Long Form Music Video
Julieta Venegas — MTV Unplugged
 Miguel Bosé — Papitour Gloria Estefan — 90 Millas Joan Manuel Serrat and Joaquín Sabina — Dos Pajaros de un Tiro Various Artists — Buenos Aires, Días y Noches de Tango''

Special Awards
Lifetime Achievement Awards
 Angélica María
 Vikki Carr
 Cheo Feliciano
 Astrud Gilberto
 María Dolores Pradera
 Estela Raval

Trustees Awards
 Simón Díaz
 Larry Harlow
 Juanito Márquez

Performers
 Gloria Estefan — "Mi Tierra / Oye Mi Canto"
 Gloria Estefan, José Feliciano, Gian Marco and Carlos Santana — "No Lloren"
 Kany García — "Esta Soledad"
 Café Tacuba — "Esta Vez"
 Heatt - National recording artist from Phoenix, Az
 Gilberto Santa Rosa — "Amnesía"
 Alejandra Guzmán — "Hasta el Final"
 Olga Tañón featuring Jenni Rivera and Vikki Carr — "Presencie tu Amor / Cosas del Amor"
 Julieta Venegas featuring Michael Salgado and David Lee Garza — "El presente"
 Flex and Belinda — "Te Quiero"
 Juanes featuring John Legend — "Me Enamora / Odio Por Amor / If You're Out There"
 Banda el Recodo — "Te Presumo"
 Jorge Celedón featuring Jimmy Zambrano and El Mariachi Vargas — "Que bonita es esta Vida"
 Fonseca — "El Arroyito"
 Jenni Rivera and Lupillo Rivera — "Sufriendo a Solas"
 Michael Salgado, Emiliano Zuleta, Fernando Otero, Héctor del Curto and David Lee Garza — "Especial accordion tribute"
 Los Tigres del Norte — "Somos mas Americanos"
 Víctor Manuelle — "Mi Salsa"
 Rosario, Juanes, Olga Tañón, Jeremías, Tommy Torres, Antonio Carmona and Belinda — "No Dudaria"

Live from Brazil:
 Sandy and Paula Toller — "E o Mundo Não se Acabou" 
 Sepultura — "The Girl from Ipanema / We've Lost You"

Presenters
 Daniela Castro and César Évora — presented Best New Artist
 Eduardo Santamarina and Montserrat Olivier — presented Best Pop Vocal Album, Female
 Carlos Santana and Ednita Nazario — presented Record of the Year
 Ximena Sariñana and Eugenio Siller — presented Best Urban Song
 Cabas and Concha Buika — presented Best Norteño Album
 Mayrín Villanueva and Grupo Pesado — presented Song of the Year
 Alexis & Fido — presented Best Contemporary Tropical Album
 Kenny G and Karyme Lozano — presented Best Tropical Song
 Kudai — presented Best Rock Song
 Tito El Bambino and Adriana Fonseca — presented Best Tejano Album
 Vicky Terrazas and Marisol Terrazas — presented Best Pop Vocal Album, Male
 Andy García — presented People of the Year
 Juan Luis Guerra — presented Album of the Year

Trivia
 Gloria Estefan became the first female to receive the academy's Person of the Year award. In addition she was the first artist to receive this honor as well as the MusiCares Person of the Year honor which she received in 1994 prior to the Grammy Awards.

References

External links
 Latin Academy of Recording Arts & Sciences: Latin Grammy 
 Univision Site: www.univision.com

Latin Grammy Awards by year
Latin Grammy Awards
Grammy Awards
Annual Latin Grammy Awards
Annual Latin Grammy Awards